Gilbert Espinosa Chávez, (March 10, 1932 – March 15, 2020) was an American prelate of the Catholic Church who served as auxiliary bishop of the Diocese of San Diego.

Biography
Gilbert Chávez was born in Ontario, California. He studied at Immaculate Heart Seminary in San Diego and was ordained a priest of the San Diego diocese on March 19, 1960.

Chávez was appointed auxiliary bishop of the Diocese of San Diego and titular bishop of Magarmel on April 9, 1974, by Pope Paul VI. He was consecrated on June 21, 1974. He was the second Mexican-American priest to be elevated to the rank of bishop in the US Catholic Church.

Pope Benedict XVI accepted Chávez's resignation on June 1, 2007.

Chávez died on March 15, 2020, at Nazareth House in San Diego.

References

 

 Catholic Church hierarchy
 Catholic Church in the United States
 Historical list of the Catholic bishops of the United States
 List of Catholic bishops of the United States
 Lists of patriarchs, archbishops, and bishops

Episcopal succession
 

21st-century American Roman Catholic titular bishops
1932 births
2020 deaths
20th-century American Roman Catholic titular bishops
People from Ontario, California
American people of Mexican descent
Catholics from California